The Cook Islands national under-17 football team is the national U-17 team of the Cook Islands and is controlled by the Cook Islands Football Association. With a population of around 24,000 people, it remains one of the smallest FIFA teams.

Competition Record

FIFA U-17 World Cup record

OFC U-17 Championship record
The OFC Under 17 Championship is a tournament held once every two years to decide the only two qualification spots for the Oceania Football Confederation (OFC) and its representatives at the FIFA U-17 World Cup.

Current Technical Staff

Current squad
The following players have been called up for the squad for the 2023 OFC U-17 Championship from 11 to 28 January 2023.

Results and fixtures

2015

2016

2018

List Of Coaches
  Tuka Tisam (2011–2013)
  Delaney Yaqona (2015)
  Richard Anderson (2016)
  Delaney Yagona (2017)
  Anthony Samuela (2017–)

References

External links
Cook Islands Football Federation official website

U
Oceanian national under-17 association football teams